Ramona the Brave is a children's novel written by Beverly Cleary. It is the third book in the Ramona series, and follows Ramona Quimby and her classmates (some of them were in her kindergarten class for the previous year) going into first grade. Ramona the Brave was first published in 1975, seven years after Ramona the Pest. It was originally illustrated by Alan Tiegreen.

Plot summary
Ramona Quimby has spent most of the summer with her friend Howie Kemp, pounding old bricks into dust in a game called Brick Factory. Brick Factory makes Ramona feel powerful, something that doesn't happen very often since she is the youngest in her family. Longing to be brave and grown-up, Ramona sticks up for her older sister, Beatrice "Beezus" Quimby, when some boys tease about her nickname (calling her "Beezus Jesus" or "Jesus Beezus") by claiming they will go to hell for mocking Jesus. However, Ramona is crushed to realize that instead of considering her a hero, Beezus is embarrassed, and becomes angrier at Ramona for defending her than she is at the boys for teasing her.

By the end of summer, Mother gets a part-time job and some workmen cut a hole in their house to add an extra bedroom (especially since Beezus and Ramona would bicker often when they shared a room). Beezus and Ramona are going to take turns using the new room (for half a year), and Ramona gets to be first, though she finds it frightening to go to sleep in the new room alone.

When first grade starts, Ramona begins learning to read. However, she is convinced that her teacher, Mrs. Griggs, dislikes her. This feeling is worsened by Ramona's tendency to get into trouble. One day when her class is making paper-bag owls for Parents' Night, Ramona sees Susan, her kindergarten nemesis, copying Ramona's owl. Mrs. Griggs sees Susan's owl first and shows it off to the class. Ramona is outraged at Susan for copying as now Ramona's owl isn't special, and destroys both owls. The next day, Ramona is forced to apologize to Susan in front of the whole class, but things improve when the class is nice to her afterward.

One day on her way to school a big dog comes after Ramona, so she takes off her shoe and throws it at him. The dog picks up her shoe and carries it away, forcing Ramona to limp her way back to school. That turns out to be the morning Mrs. Griggs finally chooses Ramona to lead the morning flag salute, and Mrs. Griggs discovers that Ramona is only wearing one shoe. Ramona uses her ingenuity to deal with the situation, and when her shoe is returned, the school secretary compliments her bravery, resulting in her nickname "the Brave".

Reception
Kirkus Reviews praised the novel, stating that the writing was "amusing, sound, empathic. . . as always." As of 2014, 97 editions of Ramona the Brave had been published in 6 languages.

See also

References

External links
 Chapter 1 of Ramona the Brave at Harperchildrens.com

1975 American novels
1975 children's books
American children's novels
Novels by Beverly Cleary
Novels set in Portland, Oregon
Mark Twain Awards